City Liquidators is a furniture warehouse in Portland, Oregon's Buckman neighborhood, in the United States. The company was established by Walt Pelett in 1977; he and his wife, Pam Pelett, still own the company as of 2015. The company occupies seven buildings totaling 390,000-square feet, as of early 2015.

Promotion
Walt and Pam's daughter, Emma Pelett, has appeared in ads for the company since she was six weeks old. She served as Miss Oregon USA in 2014, and competed in the Miss USA 2014 competition.

Reception
The Portland Mercury has said the store "has everything from new and used office furniture to tableware to new home furnishing to weird cheap plastic stuff. You will be amazed." In an article about Portland's best shopping destinations, the paper said of City Liquidators: "Expect something weird, wonderful, and vast. It's great for furniture, Egyptian sarcophagi, Urkel dolls, office supplies, fabric, dishes, carpet, and so much more."

The store has been recognized by Willamette Week "Best of Portland Reader's Poll" multiple times. It received "honorable mention" in the "Best Furniture Store" category in 2015. In 2016, the company won in the "Best Home Goods Store" category, and placed second in the "Best Furniture" category. In 2017, City Liquidators placed third in the "Best Home Goods Store" category, and second in the "Best Furniture Store" category.

City Liquidators has been included in published guides and walking tours of Portland.

References

External links

 
 

1977 establishments in Oregon
American companies established in 1977
Buckman, Portland, Oregon
Companies based in Portland, Oregon
Retail companies established in 1977